They Fly at Çiron is a 1993 science fiction novel by Samuel R. Delany, wholly rewritten and expanded from a novelette written in the 1960s.

References

1993 American novels
1993 science fiction novels
1993 fantasy novels
American science fiction novels
American fantasy novels
Novels by Samuel Delany